D Generation is the debut album by New York City glam punk band D Generation.

"No Way Out" was released as a single.  Tracks 1,3, 5 and 7 are re-recorded versions of songs that had previously been released as 7-inch singles in 1993 ("No Way Out" b/w "Guitar Mafia" and "Wasted Years" b/w "Waiting For The Next Big Parade").

Track listing
"No Way Out" (Richard Bacchus, Jesse Malin, Howie Pyro) - 4:23
"Sins of America" (Malin, Pyro, Danny Sage) - 3:39
"Guitar Mafia" (Malin, Sage) - 4:16
"Feel Like Suicide" (Malin, Sage) - 2:20
"Waiting for the Next Big Parade" (Bacchus, Malin, Pyro) - 4:28
"Falling" (Malin, Pyro) - 4:21
"Wasted Years" (Malin) - 2:53
"Stealing Time" (Malin, Pyro) - 3:28
"Ghosts" (Malin, Sage) - 3:59
"Frankie" (Bacchus, Malin) - 3:16
"Working on the Avenue" (Malin, Sage) - 2:55
"Vampire Nation" (Malin, Sage) - 4:27
"Degenerated" (Paul Cripple, Dave Insurgent of Reagan Youth) - 3:34

Personnel
D Generation
 Jesse Malin - vocals
 Richard Bacchus - guitar
 Howie Pyro - bass
 Danny Sage - guitar
 Michael Wildwood - drums

References

D Generation albums
1994 debut albums
Chrysalis Records albums